St. Paul's Hospital or St. Paul Hospital may refer to:

in Canada
St. Paul's Hospital (Vancouver)
St. Paul's Hospital (Saskatoon)

in Hong Kong
St. Paul's Hospital (Hong Kong)

in the United States
St. Paul Hospital in Dallas, Texas

in Vietnam
Saint Paul Hospital in Hanoi